Jang Sung-Ho (born January 12, 1978) is a male South Korean judoka who won a silver medal at the 2004 Summer Olympics in Athens. He also won a gold medal at the -100 kg category of the 2006 Asian Games.

He was a flag bearer at 2008 Summer Olympics in Beijing.

References

External links
 
 

1978 births
Living people
Judoka at the 2000 Summer Olympics
Judoka at the 2004 Summer Olympics
Judoka at the 2008 Summer Olympics
Olympic judoka of South Korea
Olympic silver medalists for South Korea
Place of birth missing (living people)
Olympic medalists in judo
Asian Games medalists in judo
Medalists at the 2004 Summer Olympics
Judoka at the 2002 Asian Games
Judoka at the 2006 Asian Games
South Korean male judoka
Asian Games gold medalists for South Korea
Asian Games silver medalists for South Korea
Medalists at the 2002 Asian Games
Medalists at the 2006 Asian Games
Universiade medalists in judo
Universiade gold medalists for South Korea
21st-century South Korean people